Dichomeris tactica is a moth in the family Gelechiidae. It was described by Edward Meyrick in 1918. It is found in Ecuador.

The forewings are grey irrorated (sprinkled) with whitish and blackish. The stigmata is cloudy and black, the plical is beneath the first discal. There are cloudy black marginal dots around the posterior part of the costa and termen. The hindwings are grey.

References

Moths described in 1918
tactica